Krsy is a municipality and village in Plzeň-North District in the Plzeň Region of the Czech Republic. It has about 300 inhabitants.

Administrative parts
Villages of Kejšovice, Polínka, Skelná Huť and Trhomné are administrative parts of Krsy.

References

Villages in Plzeň-North District